The Central District of Fasa County is a district (bakhsh) in Fasa County, Fars Province, Iran. At the 2006 census, its population was 116,416, in 28,582 families.  The District has one city: Fasa. The District has three rural districts (dehestan): Jangal Rural District, Kushk-e Qazi Rural District, and Sahrarud Rural District.

References 

Fasa County
Districts of Fars Province